General elections were held in Dominica on 6 December 2019. The elections were constitutionally due by March 2020, but had been widely expected to take place before the end of 2019. The result was a landslide victory for the ruling Dominica Labour Party, which won 18 of the 21 elected seats, gaining three seats. With the DLP winning a fifth consecutive election, DLP leader Roosevelt Skerrit remained Prime Minister.

Electoral system
The 21 elected members of the House of Assembly are elected in single-member constituencies. A further nine members are either elected by the Assembly after it convenes or appointed by the President (five on the advice of the Prime Minister and four on the advice of the Leader of the Opposition) to be Senators; the method of their choosing is voted on by popular vote, the vote is to determine which party is in power, from there the President is chosen by the Assembly and the President appoints a Prime Minister.

Results
The result followed disruptive protests including blocking roads by the United Workers' Party, which demanded changes to the electoral system. Following the results, Skerrit said "I call to the UWP and its supporters to hold their conduct and behaviour of the last few weeks, concede the election and work for peace."

References

Elections in Dominica
Dominica
General
Dominica